David Keane Ferry (born 1940) is the Regents' Professor of Electrical Engineering at Arizona State University (ASU), notable for his research in semiconductor devices.

Education
He received his BSEE, 1962, and MSEE, 1963, both from Texas Technical College. Ferry obtained his PhD under Arwin A. Dougal, 1966, from the University of Texas at Austin with a thesis entitled Anomalous Microwave Emission from Bulk Semiconductors.

Career
Following a postdoctoral year in Vienna (1966–67) under Karl-Heinz Seeger, he spent time at Texas Tech University (1967–73), the Office of Naval Research (1973–77), Colorado State University (1977–83), and then joined
Arizona State University in 1983.

Honors
He has received a number of honours including the IEEE Cledo Brunetti Award, 1999; IEEE (Phoenix) Engineer of Year, 1990; 
Fellow of the IEEE, 1987; Fellow of the American Physical Society, 1974; and Fellow of the Institute of Physics, 2008. His research involves the physics and simulation of semiconductor devices and quantum effects and transport in mesoscopic device structures.

Books by Ferry
 The Copenhagen Conspiracy (CRC, Taylor & Francis, 2019)
The Wigner Function in Science and Technology (IOP Publishing, Bristol, 2018)
An Introduction to Quantum Transport in Semiconductors (Pan Stanford, Singapore, 2018)
 Semiconductors: Bonds and bands (IOP Publishing, Bristol, 2013)
 Quantum Mechanics (Adam Hilger, Bristol, 1995), 2nd Edition (Inst. Physics Publ., London, 2000)
 Quantum Transport in Ultra-small Devices (Plenum, New York, 1995), Edited with Hal Grubin, Carlo Jacoboni, and Antti-Pekka Jauho
 Transport in Nanostructures (Cambridge University Press, Cambridge, 1997), with Steve Goodnick
 Semiconductor Transport (Taylor and Francis, London, 2001)
 Electronic Materials and Devices (Academic Press, San Diego, 2001), with Jon Bird.

See also 

 Quantum Aspects of Life (book)

Notes

External links 
 Ferry's homepage
 Ferry's ASU profile
 

1940 births
Living people
Cockrell School of Engineering alumni
Fellow Members of the IEEE
Fellows of the American Physical Society
21st-century American physicists
American electrical engineers
Arizona State University faculty
Quantum physicists
Texas Tech University alumni
University of Texas at Austin alumni